Para-cycling (or Paracycling) is the sport of cycling adapted for cyclists who have various disabilities. It is governed by the Union Cycliste Internationale (UCI). The sport consists of seven different events which include road and track races. The world's elite para-cyclists compete at Track and Road Worlds Championships (since 1994), the Commonwealth Games, the Paralympic Games and the World Cup (since 2010).

History
Para-cycling originated in the 1980s, starting with visually impaired riders who competed on a tandem with a sighted partner. In New York 1984 it entered the Summer Paralympic Games, where it consisted of only road races for riders with cerebral palsy. Over the next four Paraolympic Games further events were added. In Atlanta 1996 track cycling was included as well as a variety of disabilities in various functional categories. Handcycling was included in the 2000 Sydney Paralympics as an exhibition event.

Events

Para-cycling events consist of the following three road races and five track events:

Road
 Road race (men and women)
 Individual time trial (men and women)
 Handcycling team relay (men and women, mixed event)

Track
 Tandem sprint (men and women)
 Team sprint (men and women, mixed event)
 500 m time trial (men and women) or kilometre time trial (men and women)
 Individual pursuit (men and women)
 Scratch race (men and women)

Classification

Classification of riders consists of three broad groups; visual impairment, cerebral palsy and physical impairment. These are subdivided into 14 functional categories for men and women. Riders are placed in the appropriate category according to their functional ability.

B: blind (tandem) B1-2

C: cycle C1-5

H: handbike H1-5

T: tricycle T1-2

See also
 Racerunning
 Road cycling 
 Track cycling
 UCI Para-cycling Road World Championships 
 UCI Para-cycling Track World Championships
 Cycling at the Summer Paralympics

References

External links

 
Cycle sport
Paralympic sports